José Antonio Valdiviezo (born January 7, 1970 in Tartagal, Salta) is an Argentine retired football goalkeeper.

Career 

Valdiviezo has spent most of his career playing for his hometown club Juventud Antoniana in the lower leagues of Argentine football, but he was also part of the San Lorenzo squad that won the Clausura 2001 championship during his spell at the club. However, he only played two games for San Lorenzo in the Argentine Primera (none in the Clausura 2001) and two games in the Copa Libertadores.

In 2006 Valdiviezo joined Gimnasia y Esgrima de Jujuy and quickly replaced Luciano Palos as the club's first choice goalkeeper. Nonetheless, during the 2007–08 season he was relegated by Nereo Fernández.

External links
 Argentine Primera statistics

1970 births
Living people
Sportspeople from Salta Province
Argentine footballers
Association football goalkeepers
San Lorenzo de Almagro footballers
Gimnasia y Esgrima de Jujuy footballers
Atlético Tucumán footballers